Lecocq is a French surname. Notable people with the surname include:

Alexandre Charles Lecocq (1832-1918), French operetta composer
Charlotte Lecocq (born 1977), French politician
Jean-Pierre Lecocq (1947–1992), molecular biologist and entrepreneur

See also
 Lecoq
 Le Coq (disambiguation)
Coq

French-language surnames
Surnames of French origin